Adam Air Flight 574 (KI574 or DHI574) was a scheduled domestic passenger flight operated by Adam Air between the Indonesian cities of Surabaya and Manado that crashed into the Makassar Strait near Polewali in Sulawesi on 1 January 2007. All 102 people on board died, making it the deadliest aviation accident involving a Boeing 737-400. A national investigation was launched into the disaster. The final report, released on 25 March 2008, concluded that the pilots lost control of the aircraft after they became preoccupied with troubleshooting the inertial navigation system and inadvertently disconnected the autopilot. Despite a series of safety incidents, which contributed to the shut down of Adam Air in June 2008, this was the only incident resulting in fatalities during the airline's 5-year existence.

The crash is one of several transportation accidents, including the subsequent non-fatal crash of Flight 172, which resulted in the United States downgrading its safety rating of Indonesian aviation and led to large-scale transportation safety reforms in Indonesia. All Indonesian airlines were banned from flying into the European Union for several years after the crash. Adam Air was banned from flying by the Indonesian government in June 2008, and declared bankruptcy.

History

Aircraft
The aircraft involved was a Boeing 737-4Q8 with serial number 24070, registration PK-KKW, which was manufactured in 1989. Prior to service with Adam Air, owned by International Lease Finance Corporation the aircraft had been leased to seven airlines: Dan-Air, British Airways, GB Airways, Transaero, WFBN, Air One and Jat Airways. The plane was equipped with 2 CFM56-3C1 engines, had around 50,000 hours flying, and was last evaluated and declared airworthy by the Indonesian transport ministry on 25 December 2005. It was due to be checked again in late January 2007. The Surabaya airport duty manager said that there were no technical problems with the aircraft prior to departure.

Pilots
The pilot-in-command was 47-year-old Captain Refri Agustian Widodo from Sidoarjo, Indonesia, who joined Adam Air in 2006. The first officer was 36-year-old Yoga Susanto from Magelang, an employee of Adam Air who also joined the company in 2006. Captain Widodo was a seasoned veteran, having logged more than 13,300 hours of flying time. As pilot-in-command of Boeing 737 aircraft, he had more than 3,800 hours of experience. First Officer Susanto had 4,200 total flying hours and he had almost 1,000 hours logged as a Boeing 737 first officer.

Flight chronology

On 1 January 2007, at around 13:00 local time (06:00 UTC), the plane departed from Juanda Airport, Surabaya, with 96 passengers (85 adults, 7 children and 4 infants), a 56 percent load factor, and 6 crew on board. The passenger list was composed mainly of Indonesian nationals and majority of passengers were returning to Manado after New Year's Day; the foreigners were an American family of three and a German passenger. The two-hour flight, scheduled to arrive at Sam Ratulangi Airport, Manado, at 16:00 local time, was as expected until the plane vanished from air traffic control radar screens at Makassar, South Sulawesi, with the final contact at around 15:00 local time. The last known beacon position was detected by a Singaporean satellite.

Although the Juanda Airport operator, PT Angkasa Pura I, had given warnings to the pilot concerning the weather condition, the plane had departed as scheduled.

Problems started when the pilots noticed an anomaly in the inertial reference system (IRS). The first officer then attempted to troubleshoot, resetting his IRS unit by switching the knob on his side to ATT mode; this blanked out his attitude indicator, effectively making it the captain's responsibility to fly the plane straight and level for 30 seconds as the realignment process is completed. The captain does not do this. As a result of his fixation on the faulty IRS, he does not fly the aircraft, and previous maintenance issues involving the aircraft's ailerons cause the airplane to gradually roll slowly to the right. When the aircraft reaches 35 degrees right bank, and increasing, a "bank angle" audible warning sounds in the cockpit.

In a panic, Captain Widodo tells the First Officer to switch the IRS mode back to NAV, to hopefully reverse the situation they got themselves into. Now that the first officer's attitude indicator had returned to its normal state, First Officer Susanto could see that the aircraft was in a dangerous position, and attempted to notify the captain. When this failed, he then tried to recover the aircraft from its descent by turning the yoke to the left. Believing that the aircraft is flying straight and level, Captain Widodo then unknowingly reminds First Officer Susanto that the aircraft needs to fly straight and level in order to complete the IRS alignment process. Now that the aircraft had attained a 100 degree bank with a 60 degree nose down attitude, First Officer Susanto then successfully notifies the captain of their situation. In response to the first officer telling him to pull up to stop the rapid descent towards the sea, Captain Widodo pulls back on his yoke, and the aircraft, travelling over 90 percent of the speed of sound, begins to break apart in-flight. All recordings stop at 9000 feet, presumably because the aircraft had fully broken apart.

No distress signals were sent by the aircraft.

Victims

There was one German, 98 Indonesians and three American citizens on board the flight.

Search and rescue efforts

3,600 army and police personnel were mobilised in the search for the missing aircraft. One Boeing 737-200 Surveiller (a military surveillance plane), two infrared-equipped Fokker-50 aircraft from the Republic of Singapore Air Force, a Navy Nomad plane and six helicopters were dispatched to aid searching for the missing plane from the air. The Indonesian sonar-equipped ship Pulau Rengat, capable of detecting underwater metallic objects later joined the team, equipped with a mini remote-controlled submarine. It searched the sea for five days between 3 and 8 January, without success.

Naval ships combed the Makassar Strait while military personnel went through jungles and mountains of Sulawesi. In the face of heavy rain and strong winds in the area, the search efforts, coordinated from Makassar city, were focused in the area between the coastal town of Majene and the mountainous region of Toraja. The search in the two areas was due to twin signals, each carrying different emergency locator transmitter frequencies, received by the Singaporean satellite and an Indonesian military air base. The two separate locations produced on radar screens were a spot on the sea in Majene and on land in Rantepao, Tana Toraja. Searches were then expanded throughout the Island of Sulawesi; some were triggered by unknown distress signals received by a commercial Lion Air flight and an airport. A police officer at the Barru district police operational centre said that all the districts with stretches of coastline along the Makasser Strait had teams searching for the plane.

The head of the National Search and Rescue Agency told the Associated Press that he believed the aircraft was probably lost at sea. From 5 January 2007, the main focus of the search was relocated to areas south of Manado, after Manado's Sam Ratulangi Airport reported detecting a signal from the plane a day before. The rugged terrain coupled with thick and low hanging clouds continued to hamper the search efforts, however, and three relatives of missing passengers who overflew part of the area on a military reconnaissance plane admitted that the chances of finding the plane were slim. Officials said that it was unlikely any bodies had survived in one piece. On 14 January, at Indonesia's request, Singapore lent four towed underwater locator beacon detectors, sometimes called Towed Pinger Locators, and six consultants in their use to aid in the search. One week later, one of these Towed Pinger Locators, operated from the USNS Mary Sears successfully located the black boxes. On 24 January, the British ship MN Endeavour joined the search for wreckage. The ship is operated by local mining firm PT Gema Tera Mustikawati and is usually used by oil and gas drilling companies to map the seabed. By then, the Indonesian government had spent an average of Rp 1 billion (about US$110,000) a day on the search.

On 10 February, search operations were officially halted by the Search and Rescue Agency, according to Transportation Minister Hatta Rajasa, finalising the legal status of both the plane and its passengers and crew. This announcement allowed the families of the victims to start the insurance claims process.

Discovery of wreckage

Unidentified submerged objects
On Monday, 8 January, three large metal objects, suspected to be wreckage, were detected by the Indonesian ship KRI Fatahillah's sonar. Due to limitations of the navy's sonar equipment, it was not clear what the metal was, and Indonesia had no other equipment of its own. A United States Navy oceanographic survey ship, Mary Sears, arrived in the area on 9 January with better equipment to help identify the objects, and on the same date a Canadian jet with five separate air crews, working in shifts, was sent to aid with aerial mapping of the suspected location. The Indonesian Marine and Fishery Department has since suggested that the metal objects could instead have been instruments deployed to study the underwater sea current. A total of twelve Indonesian Navy ships were deployed in the area, including the KRI Ajak, KRI Leuser and KRI Nala. Extra underwater equipment, including a metal detector and an undersea camera, was sent from the United States, and arrived aboard the USNS Mary Sears on 17 January. The flight recorders were subsequently located elsewhere, in the waters in an area known as Majene, and a wide, sweeping search of the area revealed high amounts of scattered debris there, too. This debris was analysed to confirm it belonged to the 737.

Floating debris
This was confirmed by the part number on the stabiliser, 65C25746-76, which matched that of components on the missing 737. The fisherman received a reward of 50 million rupiah (equivalent to about $5,500) for his discovery. Later, other parts of the aircraft, including passenger seats, life jackets, a food tray, part of an aircraft tire, eight pieces of aluminium and fibre, an ID card, a flare and a headrest were also recovered from the area. By 13 January, a piece of a wing was also recovered. The total count of recovered objects associated with aircraft, as of 29 January, was 206, of which 194 were definitely from the 737. Pieces of clothing thought to belong to passengers were also recovered, and on 15 January, pieces of human hair and what is thought to be human scalp were recovered from a headrest that had been pulled from the sea. They were DNA tested to attempt to identify them; the results of this test are, however, unknown.

Cockpit voice recorder and flight data recorder

On 21 January 2007, the flight data recorder (FDR) and cockpit voice recorder (CVR), popularly known as black boxes, were located 42 nautical miles off the coast of West Sulawesi by the US vessel Mary Sears. The Indonesian vessel Fatahillah travelled to the location. It discovered a large amount of wreckage in the area, which was considered to be all that remained of the aircraft. A senior Indonesian marine official said on 24 January that he did not believe that the equipment required to retrieve the boxes from that depth was available in any Asian country. The black boxes had a battery life of just 30 days, and would subsequently be unable to emit locator signals.

On 3 February, Indonesian naval vessel KRI Tanjung Dalpele took affected families out to the crash site where a memorial service was held, which included throwing flowers into the sea.

Salvage

On 26 January 2007, a dispute arose between Adam Air and the Indonesian government regarding the retrieval of the black boxes. Due to the depth involved, recovery required an underwater remotely operated vehicle, but Indonesia did not have such equipment. Vice-president of Indonesia Jusuf Kalla went so far as to question the need to retrieve the black boxes at all, although experts said in response that the accident was of international significance as it could indicate a fault with the aircraft. Adam Air said that in its opinion, the black boxes should be recovered, describing the accident as being relevant on both national and international levels, but refused to pay, saying that was the responsibility of the government. Indonesia did request technical assistance from the United States, Japan and France. Jim Hall, a former chairman of the US National Transportation Safety Board, said that it was essential the boxes be recovered quickly, as at that point their 30-day battery life was about to expire, which subsequently did happen. He cited problems such as poor visibility and strong currents making it difficult to recover the devices without the signal.

On 31 January, it was reported that the US had to withdraw the vessel Mary Sears from the searches, the US military saying that the vessel had other duties. Further funding and help from the US would have to be approved by the United States Congress. At the same time, external companies were suggested as possible retrievers of the black boxes. Indonesia continued to seek help from other countries, such as France and Japan. Indonesia's National Transportation Safety Committee head Setio Rahardjo maintained that Adam Air should be charged with the retrieval costs.

It was originally confirmed that Indonesia would not pay for the salvage operation, and neither could they force Adam Air to do so. Nonetheless, Adam Air signed a contract with Phoenix International for the recovery operation. On 23 August, the Eas arrived in Sulawesi's Makassar port to begin salvage operations, which began with several days survey.

A Phoenix International underwater robot scouring the sea off Majene for on Sulawesi finally retrieved the flight data recorder on 27 August and cockpit voice recorder on 28 August. They had been moved  from their original locations by powerful underwater currents. The black boxes were sent to Washington, D.C. for analysis. The final cost of the salvage operation to retrieve the black boxes was US$3 million, of which two million was contributed by the Indonesian government, with Adam Air paying the rest. Efforts continued with the hope of recovering various large pieces of wreckage from the seabed.

Investigation
President Susilo Bambang Yudhoyono ordered a full investigation to discover the cause of the aircraft's disappearance, including the cause of any accident it may have had, before the main debris field had even been found. The investigation also looked at the airworthiness of the plane and standard procedure on aircraft operations. A team from the United States with representatives from the National Transportation Safety Board, the Federal Aviation Administration, Boeing and General Electric were sent to Indonesia to assist the Indonesian National Committee for Transportation in the investigation. A wider investigation into Indonesia's transport system as a whole was planned. Eyewitnesses reported seeing a low-flying, unstable aircraft in the area from which the wreckage has been recovered but lost sight of it after hearing a loud bang. The chief of the Indonesian Aircraft Technicians Association, Wahyu Supriantono, said that the plane was unlikely to have suffered an in-flight break up or explosion, as the debris field would have been larger, and as a result, wreckage would have been discovered earlier. The flight recorders were recovered in August 2007, without which it would not have been possible to discover the cause of the accident. The National Transportation Safety Committee (NTSC, or KNKT as per its Indonesian name) described the near eight-month wait for the recovery of the flight recorders as "unacceptable".

On 25 March 2008, the inquiry ruled that pilot error and a faulty navigation device were to blame. As they were correcting the problem, they accidentally disengaged the autopilot and failed to correct for a slow right roll even after a "bank angle" alarm sounded. By the time the pilots noticed the situation, the bank angle had reached 100° with almost 60° nose down attitude. Contrary to the correct recovery procedure, the pilots did not level the wings before trying to regain pitch control. The aircraft reached  at the end of the recording, in excess of the aircraft's maximum operating speed. The tailplane suffered a structural failure 20 seconds prior to the end of the recording, at which time the investigators concluded the aircraft was in a "critically unrecoverable state".

The NTSC determined that:
 Flight crew coordination was less than effective, as the pilot in command (PIC) did not manage task sharing and crew resource management practices were not followed.
 The crew focused their attention on troubleshooting the Inertial Reference System (IRS) failure and neither pilot was flying the aircraft.
 After the autopilot disengaged and the aircraft exceeded 30 degrees right bank, the pilots appeared to have become spatially disoriented.
 The Adam Air syllabus of pilot training did not cover complete or partial IRS failure.
 The pilots had not received training in Aircraft upset recovery, including spatial disorientation.

Maintenance concerns
Investigators quickly became concerned about apparent poor maintenance and believed it might have been an important factor in the accident.

Adam Air

Adam Air's safety record, like that of a number of other Indonesian airlines at the time, has been heavily criticized. Adam Air has reportedly bullied pilots to fly planes they knew were unsafe. Pilots have reported repeated and deliberate breaches of international safety regulations, and aircraft being flown in non-airworthy states (including one aircraft flying with a damaged door handle and another with a damaged window) for months. Other incidents include pilots being ordered to fly aircraft even after exceeding the take-off limit of five times per pilot per day, using spare parts from other planes to keep planes in the air, and ignoring requests not to take off due to unsafe aircraft. According to the Associated Press, one ex-Adam Air pilot stated that "every time you flew, you had to fight with the ground staff and the management about all the regulations you had to violate." Pilots also claimed that if they confronted their seniors, they were grounded or docked pay.

Founder Adam Adhitya Suherman had personally denied the accusations, stating that maintenance had made up "40 percent of our total operational costs".

Specific aircraft
Investigators discovered that the aircraft was the subject of a large number of maintenance discrepancies filed by pilots (called "write-ups" in the aviation industry). The highest number of complaints concerned the captain's side vertical speed indicator, which informs the air crew of the in feet per minute (1ft/min = 0.00508m/s), metres per second, or knots (1kn ≈ 0.514m/s), depending on country and type of at which the aircraft is ascending or descending. In all, 48 complaints were made regarding the instrument in the three months before the crash. The aircraft's inertial navigation system, which informs pilots of their position, orientation, and velocity, was complained about a total of thirty times. The International Herald Tribune reported that this may be of particular significance. The third most-complained about instrument was a fuel differential light, which received fifteen write-ups. Numerous complaints were also received about inoperative cockpit instrument lights, as well as multiple other malfunctions. Several complaints were made that the flaps, which modify drag and lift during take-off and landing, were jamming at twenty-five degrees upon landing, and there were two complaints that the weather radar was faulty.

Legal action
Adam Air was sued by Indonesian consumer and labour groups over the accident, for a total of one trillion rupiahs (US$100 million), to be paid to the families of the victims. According to a lawyer for the families, speaking in a press conference along with the secretary for the Adam Air KI-574 Passengers' Families Association (formed in the aftermath of the disaster), 30 of the victims' families intend to sue Boeing instead of Adam Air over the accident. This does not necessarily mean that all of the others will sue Adam Air, however, as they may not necessarily exercise their right to sue at all. Representatives of the families have explained that they believe the plane was brought down by a faulty rudder control valve, similar to the accidents involving United Airlines Flight 585 and USAir Flight 427, which went down in the early 1990s, although there is no evidence that proves this. They have explained that, as a result, they are suing Boeing and Parker Hannifin, the valve's manufacturer, although airlines using the 737-300, -400, and -500 have been warned about problems with the rudder control valves.

Reaction

Government
Vice-president Jusuf Kalla described the disappearance as an "international issue." A few days after the disappearance, President Susilo Bambang Yudhoyono set up the National Team for Transportation Safety and Security, partially as a response to the high number of recent transportation accidents in Indonesia, and partially as a direct response to the event. The team was tasked to evaluate thoroughly the transport safety procedures and review the existing regulations on transportation. It was not, however, to investigate accidents; the entity deemed responsible for this was the Komisi Nasional Keselamatan Transportasi (KNKT), or in English the National Transportation Safety Commission (NTSC), which is part of Departemen Perhubungan (Ministry of Transportation).

Adam Air
Adam Air has been accused by multiple organisations of poor maintenance, and of ordering pilots to fly in all weather and regardless of aircraft conditions. Adam Adhitya Suherman, founder of the family-run airline, has personally denied these accusations, and has said that maintenance consumes "up to 40 percent of our total operational costs". 
Adam Air has compensated the families of deceased passengers Rp 500 million (equivalent to about US$55,000 or €42,000) per passenger. It also compensated families of the flight crew.

There have been calls from relatives of the dead for Adam Air to build a memorial to the victims in Makassar, South Sulawesi. Adam Air said that if an agreement could be reached, then they would fulfill the request.

Aftermath
Shortly after the crash, Adam Air changed the number of the regular Surabaya–Manado flight from Flight 574 to Flight 582. This accident also weakened Adam Air's image, which at the time was already negative among the public because of their frequent breakdowns and delays. The crash also exacerbated financial difficulties at the airline, which ceased operations a few years later.

The Indonesian government announced plans immediately after the accident to ban jets over ten years old for any commercial purpose. Previously the age limit was 35 years or 70,000 landings. Although this was in response to a large number of aircraft accidents, it was mainly in response to this accident and the Flight 172 incident. Indonesia also announced that the Transportation Ministry would be reshuffled in response to this accident and the loss of the ferries MV Senopati Nusantara and Levina 1. Among those replaced were the directors of air and sea transports and the chairman of the National Committee for Transportation Safety. Indonesia also introduced a new system of ranking airlines according to their safety record, with a level one ranking meaning the airline has no serious issues, a level two ranking meaning the airline must fix problems, and a level three ranking meaning that the airline may be forced to shut down.

In March 2007, the Indonesian government announced that Adam Air was one of fifteen airlines that would have their licences revoked within three months unless they could improve their safety standards. The other airlines included Batavia Air, Jatayu Airlines, Kartika Airlines, Manunggal Air Services, Transwisata Prima Aviation and Tri-MG Intra Asia Airlines. These airlines were all targeted as a direct result of the crash, as they were in the third level of the ranking system introduced as a result. All Indonesian airlines, including state-owned Garuda Indonesia, were told they would need to make some improvements, with none of them receiving a level one ranking.

It was reported on 28 June 2007, that Adam Air would escape closure and had been upgraded one rank in safety rating, to the middle tier. The airlines that lost their licences were Jatayu Gelang Sejahtera, Aviasi Upataraksa, Alfa Trans Dirgantara, and Prodexim. Additionally, Germania Trisila Air, Atlas Delta Setia, Survey Udara Penas, Kura-Kura Aviation and Sabang Merauke Raya Air Charter were grounded pending improvements and facing potential licence revocation.

On 16 April 2007, the American Federal Aviation Administration responded to the results of the new airline survey by downgrading Indonesia's air safety oversight category from a 1 to a 2 because of "serious concerns" over safety. This means it views Indonesia's civil aviation authority as failing to oversee air carriers in accordance with minimum international standards. As a direct result, the US Embassy in Jakarta issued a warning to all American citizens flying in or out of Indonesia to avoid using Indonesian airlines, and instead use international carriers with better safety reputations. This was followed on 28 June 2007 by the addition of all Indonesia's airlines, none of which flew to Europe at the time, to the List of air carriers banned in the EU; the ban was lifted for flag carrier Garuda Indonesia and three smaller airlines in 2009, and by 2018 all Indonesian airlines were once again permitted to fly to the EU. Budhi Mulyawan Suyitno, Director-general of civil aviation at the Indonesian transport ministry, responded by saying that he felt Indonesia had made the improvements required by the EU. A blanket ban on all Indonesian airlines flying to the United States was imposed in 2007, and lifted in 2018.

On 18 March 2008, shortly after a further accident in Batam, the airline's Air Operator's Certificate was suspended by the Indonesian government. Three months later, the air certificate was revoked, and the airline ceased operations and filed for bankruptcy.

Flight 172

On 21 February 2007, just 51 days after the loss of Flight 574, Flight 172, an Adam Air Boeing 737-300 aircraft (registration PK-KKV) flying from Jakarta to Surabaya had a hard landing at Juanda International Airport. The incident caused the fuselage of the plane to crack and bend in the middle, with the tail of the plane drooping towards the ground. There were no reports of serious injuries from the incident. As a result, six Adam Air 737s were grounded awaiting safety checks. Adam Air described this as "harsh punishment" for an accident it blamed on poor weather conditions, but Vice-president Kalla had said that all Boeing 737-300s should be checked.

Alleged cockpit voice recording leakage

In early August 2008, a five-minute-38-second digital recording allegedly retrieved from the plane's cockpit voice recorder was widely circulated on the Internet and transcribed by the media. The recording, which had been publicly distributed through chain e-mails, begins with what is believed by some to be a conversation between pilot Refi Agustian Widodo and co-pilot Yoga Susanto before the crash. Approximately two minutes before the end of the recording, the autopilot disconnect horn can be heard to sound, followed approximately a minute later by "bank angle" warnings from the GPWS and the altitude alerter. Immediately thereafter, as the aircraft begins its final dive, the shotgun-like sounds of engine compressor surges and the overspeed "clacker" can be heard, along with two background voices screaming in terror and shouting out the Takbir. Towards the end of the recording, there is a dramatic increase in windshield noise as well as two loud bangs, the second greater than the first, consistent with structural failure of the aircraft. This is followed 20 seconds later by abrupt silence. It is likely that, when the pilots regained visual ground contact, they quickly pulled up, overloading the horizontal stabiliser downwards and a main wing spar upwards. This recording was dismissed by officials who said that it was not authentic and was not the original recording.

Dramatization
The crash was featured in Season 7 of the documentary series Mayday, on the episode "Flight 574: Lost".

See also

 Aviation safety
 List of accidents and incidents involving commercial aircraft
 List of aircraft accidents and incidents resulting in at least 50 fatalities
 List of accidents and incidents involving airliners by airline (A–C)
 MV Senopati Nusantara, which sank during the same storm.
West Air Sweden Flight 294
Korean Air Flight 8509
Copa Airlines Flight 201
Air India Flight 855
Birgenair Flight 301

Notes

References

Further reading

External links

 National Transportation Safety Committee
 Final report  (Archive)
 PUBLIC RELEASE OF FINAL REPORT – PK-KKW – FL DHI 574 (Archive)
  PEMBUKAAN PUBLIC RELEASE PK-KKW TGL 25 MARET 200 (Archive)
 Cockpit Voice Recorder transcript and accident summary

2007 in Indonesia
Airliner accidents and incidents caused by weather
Airliner accidents and incidents caused by pilot error
Aviation accidents and incidents in Indonesia
Aviation accidents and incidents in 2007
Accidents and incidents involving the Boeing 737 Classic
Marine salvage operations
January 2007 events in Asia
 Adam Air accidents and incidents